Montia australasica is a species of flowering plant in the genus Montia.

Description

Range

Habitat

Ecology

Etymology

Taxonomy

References

australasica
Flora of Australia
Flora of New Zealand